Lumiq Studios S.r.l  is an Italian company, Publicly owned, producing CGI and live action movies. Through its Studios, Lumiq provides support to activities of post production and digital intermediate, working in the development, production and marketing of products and services for film, television, advertising, multimedia and new media.

It is based in Turin, Italy, in Corso Lombardia 190, in the complex of Virtual Reality & Multi Media Spa, i.e. the older Fert Studies.

Currently, through the 100% control of Virtual Spa, Lumiq is owned by the City of Turin, the Piedmont Region, the Province of Turin, Turin Polytechnic and the University of Turin.

Filmography

Past films and videos 
The Devil's Violinist, 2013 - executive production (Italian Unit)
Black to the moon 3D (2012), 2012, animation, 90 minutes, co-production with Baleuko films, distribution
Italian Movies, 2012, live action, 90 min, co-production with Indiana Production
When the Night, 2011, live action, 90 min, co-production with Cattleya
Some say no, 2011, live action, 35 mm, 83 min - joint venture with Cattleya
Un Altro Mondo, 2010, live action, 35 mm, 83 min - joint venture with Cattleya
The woman of my life, 2010, live action, 35 mm, 83 min - joint venture with Cattleya
OGR: Officine Grandi Riparazioni, 2010, video documentary - production
Promeny (Changes), 2009, live action, 35 mm, 83 min - co-production with Czech Republic
Donkey Xote, 2007, 3D animation, 35 mm, 90 min, co-production with Filmax Animation; the movie has the recognition of cultural interest of the MIBAC
La notte eterna del coniglio, 2007, horror, 35 mm, 72 min, co-production with RAI
Prisoners of Freedom, 2005, directed by Laura Quaglia, historical movie of the history of Solidarność, 35 mm, 85 min - co-produced by The Quail Flies independent(I) and GlobusXXI(RU)
L'età del Fuoco, 2004 - co-production

Projects in Development 
The Amphibian Man, 2014 - co-production with Trikita Entertainment and Bavaria Film Partners
Cherry Chérie - co-production with Kitchenfilm
Ruby - production and distribution

Past Television 
Lot of Laughing, 2008, TV series - co-production with Cydonia and Universo
Amazing World, 2006 - co-production with RAI
Do You Like Hitchcock?, 2005 - post production services
La bambina dalle mani sporche, 2005 - production facility
Amazing History, 2004 - co-production with RAI
Cartoons on the Bay, 2003 - co-production with RAI

Services 
The Gambler Who Wouldn't Die, 2013 - sound services
Cosimo e Nicole, 2012 - production services
Rust, 2011 - post-production sound services
Women Vs Men, 2011 - production services
Men Vs Women, 2010 - production services
Imago Mortis, 2009 - production facility
Armando Testa - Povero ma moderno, 2009, documentary - production facility
Baarìa, 2009, post-production facilities
Tutti intorno a Linda, 2009, production services
The Demons of St. Petersburg, 2008 - production services
Peopling the Palaces at Venaria Reale, 2007 - production facility
Il dolce e l'amaro, 2007 - production services
Centochiodi, 2007 - post-production services
Anastezsi, 2007 - production services
Il 7 e l'8, 2007 - post-production services
, 2006 - post-production - nomination for special effects David di Donatello
La strada di Levi, 2006, documentary - post-production services
I giorni dell'abbandono, 2005 - production facility
Round Trip, 2004 - production services
After Midnight, 2004 - production services
Senza freni, 2003 - production services

References

External links
Lumiq Studios Official website

Italian companies established in 2002
Mass media companies established in 2002
Film production companies of Italy
Mass media in Turin